Ricardo Aníbal Fort Campa (5 November 1968 − 25 November 2013) was an Argentine socialite, entrepreneur and television director. Although his career lasted four years, Fort was one of the most popular personalities in his country.

Early life 
The Felfort confectionery company was founded in 1912 in Buenos Aires by Fort's grandfather, Felipe Fort, and soon became one of the top confectionery companies in Argentina. Ricardo's father, Carlos Augusto Fort, took control of the company after Felipe's death in 1969. Ricardo Fort developed a close relationship with his mother, opera singer Marta Campa.

Businesses 
Fort developed businesses in the textile industry and in modeling as well as owned the Fortmen clothing line.

Theater

Television 
In 2009, Fort participated in the reality series El musical de tus sueños.

In 2010, Fort was selected to be one of the judges of the seventh season of Bailando por un Sueño 2010.

In 2011 he worked in the theatrical production Fortuna 2.

Music 
Fort released a single called No volverás early in his career.

Personal life 
In 2010, Fort revealed in an interview on the talk show Tienen la Palabra that his twin children Felipe and Marta were born of a surrogate mother found through the auspices of a company in California.

He was openly bisexual.

Death 
Fort died on 25 November 2013 in a Buenos Aires clinic, due to cardiac arrest following a gastrointestinal bleeding. He was being treated for a knee injury he suffered a few months before. He was 45 years old. Just days before, he had suffered a femoral fracture in Miami, Florida.

References

External links 

1968 births
2013 deaths
Argentine television personalities
Argentine television directors
Businesspeople from Buenos Aires
Argentine LGBT actors
Argentine LGBT businesspeople
Argentine bisexual people
Argentine male stage actors
Argentine male television actors
Bisexual male actors
Bisexual businesspeople
LGBT television directors
Deaths from gastrointestinal hemorrhage
Bailando por un Sueño (Argentine TV series) judges
Argentine socialites